Paul Victor Johns is a former professional American football player who played wide receiver for four seasons for the Seattle Seahawks in the National Football League (NFL). He went to college at University of Tulsa .

References

External links

Seattle Seahawks bio

1958 births
Living people
People from Waco, Texas
American football wide receivers
Tulsa Golden Hurricane football players
Tyler Apaches football players
Seattle Seahawks players